The River Croal is a river located in Greater Manchester, England. It is a tributary of the River Irwell.

Rising at the confluence of Middle Brook and Deane Church Brook, it flows eastwards through Bolton, collecting Gilnow Brook and the larger River Tonge at Darcy Lever. Most of the river is culverted through Bolton town centre, running under Knowsley Street, Market Place and Bridge Street.
Before 1836, the River Croal formed the boundary between the townships of Great and Little Bolton.

The name of the river is derived from the Old English croh and wella, the winding stream. It was possibly originally called the Middlebrook along its entire length as early references mention the Mikelbrok, (mycel and broc), the great stream but not the Croal.

It meets the Irwell at Nob End, Kearsley after a total course of around ten miles.

Tributaries
 Doe Hey Brook (R)
 Will Hill Brook
 Blackshaw Brook (L)
 River Tonge
 Bradshaw Brook
 Astley Brook
 Eagley Brook
 Middle Brook (Ls)
 Bessy Brook
 Knutshaw Brook (R)
 Deane Church Brook (Rs)

References
Notes

Bibliography

External links
 River Croal Photographs
 Snake Oil UE, River Croal Culverts

Croal
Croal
Geography of the Metropolitan Borough of Bolton
1Croal
Croal catchment